Wei Song (魏松; born 1955) is a Chinese operatic tenor.

With Dai Yuqiang and Hong Kong born Warren Mok he has performed abroad as "China's Three Tenors." He studied with Zhou Xiaoyan at the Shanghai Conservatory of Music.

Discography
 Miracle (奇迹 qíjì) CD 2011 - Chinese standards such as Molihua (茉莉花)

Video:
 Zan Yuen DVD
 China's Three Tenors DVD

References

1955 births
Living people
Chinese operatic tenors
20th-century Chinese male opera singers